The Hubei Provincial Museum (Chinese: 湖北省博物馆) is one of the best known museums in China, with a large amount of state-level historic and cultural relics. Established in 1953, the museum moved to its present location in 1960 and gained its present name in 1963.  Since 1999 a number of new buildings have been added. The museum received 1,992,512 visitors in 2017.

The museum is located in the Wuchang District of Wuhan, Hubei Province, not far from the west shore of Wuhan's East Lake. It has a collection of over 200,000 objects, including the Sword of Goujian, an ancient set of bronze bells (Bianzhong) and extensive artifacts from the Tomb of Marquis Yi of Zeng and the tombs at Baoshan. The particular importance of several of the archaeological items in the museum's collection has been recognized by the national government by including them into the short list of Chinese cultural relics forbidden to be exhibited abroad.

On the afternoon of April 27, 2018, China's paramount leader Xi Jinping and Indian Prime Minister Narendra Modi visited Hubei Provincial Museum.

Gallery

See also 
 List of museums in China

References

External links 

 Official website of Hubei Provincial Museum
 Hubei museum on China Travel Guide
 Hubei Provincial Museum at Google Cultural Institute

Museums in Wuhan
Museums established in 1953
National first-grade museums of China